Monte Malbe is a mountain in Perugia, Italy. It is mainly known for its association with a World War II battle and for being home to the Fraticelli of Monte Malbe.

References

Malbe
Geography of Perugia